The 1848 United States House of Representatives elections in Wisconsin were held on May 8, 1848 to elect the first U.S. representatives from the newly admitted state of Wisconsin. These representatives were elected to terms that would last the remainder of the 30th Congress. Members were elected to full terms on November 7, 1848, which would begin on the upcoming 31st Congress.

Upon statehood, Wisconsin was originally delegated two districts which were both held by Democratic representatives. The state gained a third seat in the general election, leading to the opposing Whig and Free Soil parties gaining seats.

Short term elections

District 1

District 2

Full term elections

District 1

District 2

District 3

See also 
 1848 United States Senate elections in Wisconsin

References 

1848
Wisconsin
United States House of Representatives